is a passenger railway station located in Higashinada-ku, Kobe, Hyōgo Prefecture, Japan. It is operated by the private transportation company Hanshin Electric Railway.

Lines

Layout
The station consists of two elevated island platforms serving four tracks. Part of the platform crosses the Ishiya River. The gap between the stopped train and the platform is partially wide, and the width of the platform itself is narrow, making it a particularly dangerous station among Hanshin stations. Due to the narrow width of the platform, there is no waiting room. There is only one ticket gate on the ground level.

Platforms

Gallery

History
Mikage Station opened on the Hanshin Main Line on 12 April 1905.

Service was suspended owing to the Great Hanshin earthquake in January 1995. Restoration work on the Hanshin Main Line took 7 months to complete.

Station numbering was introduced on 21 December 2013, with Mikage being designated as station number HS-25.

Passenger statistics
In fiscal 2020, the station was used by an average of 13,142 passengers daily

Surrounding area
Route 2 (国道2号) - Arterial route from Osaka to Fukuoka
Mikage Classe (御影クラッセ) (Hankyu Oasis Mikage, Hanshin Mikage, etc.)
Yuzuruha Shrine (15 minutes walk north, 弓弦羽神社)
Higashinada Police Station (東灘警察署)
Hyogo Prefectural Mikage High School（兵庫県立御影高等学校）
Kobe Municipal Mikage Junior High School（神戸市立御影中学校）
Kobe Municipal Mhkage Elementary School（神戸市立御影小学校）
Morozoff Limited Kansai Branch (former headquarters)

Buses
Departing from the north side
Route 36 for JR Rokkomichi (JR六甲道), Hankyu Rokko, Kobe University Main Gate and Tsurukabuto-danchi (鶴甲団地)
Route 38 for Higashinada Ward Office, Hakutsuru Fine Art Museum and Uzumoridai
Departing from the south side
Route 33 for Higashinada Ward Office, Okamoto and 
Route 35 for Higashinada Ward Office and Uozaki
Route 39 for JR Sumiyoshi, Hankyu Mikage, Konan Hospital, Kamokogahara and Sumiyoshi Primary School attached to Kobe University

Kobe Ferry Bus 
West side of Mikage Station, in front of Lawson Store 100
For Rokko Island Ferry Terminal and Rokko Passenger Ship Terminal

Kobe Minato Kanko 
West side of Mikage Station (northbound), in front of Morozoff Limited Kansai Branch
For Hankyu Mikage, Okamoto and Shukugawa Green Town (Hankyu Shukugawa)
West side of Mikage Station (southbound), north of Edition appliance store Mikage
For Rokko Island

See also
List of railway stations in Japan

References

External links

 Mikage Station website 

Railway stations in Japan opened in 1905
Railway stations in Kobe
Hanshin Main Line